The Bikin is a river in Primorsky and Khabarovsk Krais in Russia. Its main tributaries are the rivers Alchan, Klyuchevaya, Kontrovod and Zeva.

The town Bikin is situated on the river Bikin. In 2015, a significant portion of the Bikin basin was incorporated into the creation of Bikin National Park, one of the major protected areas of the Russian Federation. In 2018, Bikin River Valley was included in the boundaries of the Central Sikhote-Alin and became a part of the World Heritage cite.

References

Rivers of Khabarovsk Krai
Rivers of Primorsky Krai
World Heritage Sites in Russia